Albert James Murray, Baron Murray of Gravesend (9 January 1930 – 10 February 1980) was a British Labour Party politician.

Murray represented Dulwich on London County Council from 1958 until the council's abolition, in 1965.  At the 1964 general election, he was elected as Member of Parliament (MP) for Gravesend in Kent, a marginal seat which was normally won by the party forming the government.  Indeed, Murray held the seat until it was regained by the Conservatives in 1970, the year Edward Heath became prime minister.

From 1969 to 1970, he was a junior minister in Harold Wilson's government, as Parliamentary Secretary to the Ministry of Transport, under Minister of Transport Richard Marsh.

After leaving the House of Commons, Murray was given a life peerage on 28 June 1976 as Baron Murray of Gravesend, of Gravesend in the County of Kent. From 1976 to 1979 he was a Member of the European Parliament. He died in 1980, at the age of 50 whilst watching his beloved Millwall. He was also President of Gravesend & Northfleet and the North Kent Sunday Football League.

References

External links 
 

1930 births
1980 deaths
Labour Party (UK) MEPs
Labour Party (UK) MPs for English constituencies
Labour Party (UK) life peers
MEPs for the United Kingdom 1973–1979
Members of London County Council
Members of Southwark Metropolitan Borough Council
Ministers in the Wilson governments, 1964–1970
UK MPs 1964–1966
UK MPs 1966–1970
UK MPs who were granted peerages
Life peers created by Elizabeth II